Beckler Peak is a mountain in the U.S state of Washington located in the Mt. Baker-Snoqualmie National Forest near Skykomish.

Hazards 

The Northern slope is a sheer cliff.

Recreation 
From the trailhead to the peak itself is a hike of approximately eight miles roundtrip. The summit affords a 360 degree view of the area, which includes Glacier Peak to the North.

See also 
 Mount Baker-Snoqualmie National Forest
 Mountain peaks of North America
 Mountain peaks of the United States
 Beckler River

References

External links 
 GNIS Feature Detail Report for Beckler Peak

Cascade Range
Mountains of Washington (state)
Mountains of Snohomish County, Washington
Mount Baker-Snoqualmie National Forest